Martine "Marty" Puketapu was born in Auckland, New Zealand on 16 September 1997 and has represented New Zealand in association football at international level.

Club career
Puketapu played for Three Kings United from Auckland, helping to lead them to a championship in 2016, after scoring 27 goals in 18 games.

College career
Puketapu played in college for Colorado Buffaloes of University of Colorado Boulder. She played 40 matches over 2 seasons and was selected for Pac-12 All-Freshman team in her first year.

International career
Puketapu was a member of the New Zealand U-17 side at the 2012 FIFA U-17 Women's World Cup in Azerbaijan and again at the 2014 FIFA U-17 Women's World Cup in Costa Rica. Puketapu also went to two FIFA U-20 Women's World Cups with the New Zealand U-20 side, the 2014 tournament in Canada and the 2016 tournament in Papua New Guinea.

Puketapu made her senior début as a substitute in a 0–3 loss to Austria on 3 March 2017.

References

Living people
1997 births
Women's association football midfielders
Association footballers from Auckland
New Zealand women's association footballers
New Zealand women's international footballers